Ponerosteus is a dubious genus of archosauromorph which was first identified as "Iguanodon exogirarum" by Antonín Frič in 1878 for a specimen from the Cenomanian (Late Cretaceous of the Czech Republic, near Holubice by Kralupy nad Vltavou; Korycanar Formation). He later (1905) renamed it Procerosaurus, unaware that this name was already in use (von Huene, 1902). It was renamed Ponerosteus exogyrarum (species name amended) by George Olshevsky in 2000; however, the taxon is considered a nomen dubium by most, as the type material is extremely poor, being apparently an internal cast of a tibia from an animal that may or may not be a dinosaur. The name Ponerosteus can be translated as "bad", "worthless", or "useless bone", which accurately describes the nature of the material.

References

Prehistoric animals of Europe
Nomina dubia
Fossil taxa described in 2000
Taxa named by George Olshevsky